Martins Nnabugwu Ekwueme  (born 10 February 1985 in Aboh Mbaise) is a Nigerian-born Polish professional footballer who plays as a midfielder for KS Legnickie Pole.

Career

Club
Ekwueme first came to Poland in the 2000–01 season after joining Jeziorak Iława. Following the 2006–07 season, he joined Legia Warsaw. Then, on 31 August, he joined Zagłębie Lubin on a year loan deal. In the summer of 2010, he was traded to Zagłębie Lubin.

In July 2011 he was loaned to Zawisza Bydgoszcz on a one-year deal.

On 15 February 2014 he signed for Indian side Sporting Clube de Goa.

References

External links

1985 births
Living people
Nigerian footballers
Nigerian expatriate footballers
Sportspeople from Imo State
Association football midfielders
Jeziorak Iława players
Polonia Warsaw players
Wisła Kraków players
Legia Warsaw players
Zagłębie Lubin players
SK Sigma Olomouc players
Zawisza Bydgoszcz players
Flota Świnoujście players
LZS Piotrówka players
Lechia Zielona Góra players
Górnik Polkowice players
Czech First League players
Ekstraklasa players
I liga players
II liga players
III liga players
Expatriate footballers in the Czech Republic
Expatriate footballers in Poland
Expatriate footballers in India
Expatriate footballers in Cyprus
Nigerian expatriate sportspeople in the Czech Republic
Nigerian expatriate sportspeople in Poland
Nigerian expatriate sportspeople in India
Nigerian expatriate sportspeople in Cyprus
Naturalized citizens of Poland